Henry Hay may refer to:

Harry Hay (swimmer) (1893–1952), Australian swimmer
Henry Hay (writer) (1910–1985), journalist, translator and writer on magic
Harry Hay (Henry Hay, Jr., 1912–2002), gay rights and labor activist

See also
Henry Hays (disambiguation)
Henry Maurice Drummond-Hay